The Bayer designation Nu Lupi (ν Lup / ν Lupi) is shared by two stars, in the constellation Lupus (constellation):

ν¹ Lupi
ν² Lupi

Lupi, Nu
Lupus (constellation)